The 2012–13 Top 14 competition was a French domestic rugby union club competition operated by the Ligue Nationale de Rugby (LNR). Two new teams from the 2011–12 Pro D2 season were promoted to Top 14 this year, Grenoble and Stade Montois in place of the two relegated teams, CA Brive and Lyon OU. Home-and-away play began on 17 August 2012 and continued through to 5 May 2013. The regular season was followed by a three-round playoff involving the top six sides. The final was contested at the Stade de France between Toulon and Castres; the match was won 19–14 by Castres to earn them their first title since the controversial final in 1993.

Teams

Team information

Table

Playoffs

All times are in Central European Summer Time (UTC+2).

Quarter-finals

Semi-finals

Final

Statistics

Top points scorers 
Updated 11 June 2013

Top try scorers 
Updated 11 June 2013

See also
2012–13 Rugby Pro D2 season
List of 2013-2014 Top 14 transfers

References

External links

  Ligue Nationale de Rugby – Official website
 Top 14 on Planetrugby.com

Top 14 seasons
 
France